Wes Allen may refer to:

Wes Allen (politician) (born 1975), Secretary of State of Alabama
Wes Allen (soccer) (born 1986), American soccer player